Jack Sisson (1821) was an enslaved African American who sided with the Patriots and served in the First Rhode Island Regiment during the American Revolutionary War.  Sisson was one of the key figures in the July 1777 capture of British General Richard Prescott. Sisson was among about forty troops under the command of Colonel William Barton who traversed British controlled waters to sneak up and capture Prescott.  Sisson served both as the pilot for one of the boats and also used his head to break down Prescott's door. The mission was accomplished without losses.

References

1743 births
1821 deaths
Rhode Island militiamen in the American Revolution
Black Patriots
18th-century American slaves